Bérénice Bejo (born 7 July 1976) is a French-Argentine actress best known for playing Christiana in A Knight's Tale (2001) and Peppy Miller in The Artist (2011). Her work in the latter earned her a nomination for the Academy Award for Best Supporting Actress and won her the César Award for Best Actress. For her performance in The Past, she won Best Actress at the Cannes Film Festival in 2013 and was nominated for a César.

Personal life 
Bejo was born in Buenos Aires, Argentina, and is the daughter of Argentine filmmaker Miguel Bejo and his wife Silvia, a lawyer. When she was three, her family moved to France, escaping from Argentina's most recent civil-military dictatorship (1976–1983). Her father enrolled her at the school of Les Enfants Terribles theater.

In 2006, she starred in OSS 117: Cairo, Nest of Spies, where she met director Michel Hazanavicius, whom she later married. They have two children: Lucien and Gloria.

Career 
In 2001, Bejo made her American film debut, playing the role of Christiana in A Knight's Tale opposite Heath Ledger. Christiana is a lady-in-waiting to Jocelyn (Shannyn Sossamon).

In 2002, she toured in France with Marie-France Pisier and Guillaume Depardieu.

In 2003, Bejo starred as Olivia in 24 Hours in the Life of a Woman by Laurent Bouhnik.

Under the direction of Steve Suissa, she seduces Stephane Freiss and Titoff in The Grand Role (2004), and a comedy about the world of actors, and Cavalcade (2005), a drama dealing with the theme of disability.

In 2006, she made a comeback by acting alongside Jean Dujardin in OSS 117: Cairo, Nest of Spies by Michel Hazanavicius. This was the first collaboration of the trio.

In 2007, she made an appearance in the short film La Pomme d'Adam.

In 2008, she appeared in two romantic comedies: Modern Love Bouquet and Stéphane Kazandjian. The same year she gave birth to her first child by Hazanavicius.

The documentary reconstructs Clouzot's film, alternating between scenes from the 1964 film and dialogue readings between Jacques Gamblin (for Serge Reggiani) and Béjo (for Romy Schneider).

In the 2011 film, The Artist, which is directed by Hazanavicius and stars Dujardin, Bejo plays Peppy Miller, a 1920s film actress. Her performance received critical acclaim, the César Award for Best Actress, and several award nominations: the Screen Actors Guild Award for Outstanding Performance by a Female Actor in a Supporting Role, the Golden Globe Award for Best Supporting Actress – Motion Picture award, BAFTA Award for Best Actress in a Leading Role and the Academy Award for Best Supporting Actress.

In 2012, she was announced as the host of the opening and closing ceremonies at the 2012 Cannes Film Festival. She dubbed the role of Mérida in the French dub of the Disney/Pixar film Brave. In June 2012, Bejo was invited to join the Academy of Motion Picture Arts and Sciences. The same month, she received the Prix Romy Schneider.

Filmography

Theatre

References

External links

 
 

1976 births
21st-century French actresses
Argentine emigrants to France
Best Actress César Award winners
Best Actress Lumières Award winners
Cannes Film Festival Award for Best Actress winners
French film actresses 
French silent film actresses
Living people
Actresses from Buenos Aires
20th-century French actresses